The 2011–12 Euro Hockey Tour was the 16th season of Euro Hockey Tour. It started on 10 November 2011 and ended on 29 April 2012. A total of 24 games were played, with each team playing 12 games. The season consisted of the Karjala Tournament, the Channel One Cup, the Oddset Hockey Games, and the Kajotbet Hockey Games. The Czech Republic took their first Euro Hockey Tour gold medal since 1997–98, and thus received the largest prize money of €75,000.

Total standings

GP: Games played; W: Wins; OTW: Overtime wins; OTL: Overtime losses; L: Losses in regulation time; GF: Goals forward; GA: Goals allowed; Pts: Points

 – Euro Hockey Tour champion and received €75,000 prize money. 
 – Received €30,000 prize money. 
 – Received €15,000 prize money.

Karjala Tournament

The 2011 Karjala Tournament was played between 10–13 November 2011, and was won by Russia. Five of the matches were played in Helsinki, Finland, and one match in Örnsköldsvik, Sweden.

Channel One Cup

The 2011 Channel One Cup was played between 15–18 December 2011. Five of the matches were played in the Moscow, Russia, and one match in Chomutov, Czech Republic. The tournament was won by Sweden, who therefore recorded their first win in the Russian tournament since 1998.

Oddset Hockey Games

The 2012 Oddset Hockey Games was played between 9–12 February 2012. Five of the matches were played in Stockholm, Sweden, and one match in Helsinki, Finland. Sweden won the tournament for the second consecutive year.

Kajotbet Hockey Games

The 2012 Kajotbet Hockey Games was played between 26–29 April 2012. Five of the matches were played in Brno, Czech Republic, and one match in Saint Petersburg, Russia. Finland won the tournament, for the fifth time in history.

Statistics

Scoring leaders
List shows the top skaters sorted by points, then goals. If the list exceeds 10 skaters because of a tie in points, all of the tied skaters are shown.
GP = Games played; G = Goals; A = Assists; Pts = Points; PIM = Penalties in minutes; POS = Position  positions: F = Forward; RW = Right winger; LW = Left winger; C = Centre; D = Defenceman
Source:  
Updated: 2 May 2012 19:46 UTC

Leading goaltenders
Only the top five goaltenders, based on save percentage, who have played 40% of their team's minutes, are included in this list.

Rosters
These tables shows all skaters and goaltenders who have at least one game in the Euro Hockey Tour 2011–12. The tables show how many games they played, how many points they've scored, and their penalties in minutes.
POS = Position; GP = Games played; G = Goals; A = Assists; Pts = Points; PIM = Penalties In Minutes
Source: [source link] 
Updated: (UTC)

Czech Republic

Finland

Russia

Sweden

References

 
2011–12 in European ice hockey
Euro Hockey Tour